Joyce Chepchumba (born 6 November 1970 in Kericho) is a long distance athlete from Kenya.

Achievements 
1995
Tilburg Ten Miles winner
Parelloop 10Kwinner 
1997 
London Marathon winner
1998 
Chicago Marathon winner
1999 
London Marathon winner 
Chicago Marathon winner
Berlin Half Marathon winner
Great North Run winner
2000 
Tokyo International Women's Marathon winner 
2000 Summer Olympics bronze medallist 
Berlin Half Marathon winner
2001
Berlin Half Marathon winner
2002
New York City Marathon winner
2004
Lisbon Half Marathon winner
Berlin Half Marathon winner

References

External links

1970 births
Living people
Athletes (track and field) at the 1996 Summer Olympics
Athletes (track and field) at the 2000 Summer Olympics
Kenyan female long-distance runners
Kenyan female marathon runners
London Marathon female winners
Olympic athletes of Kenya
Olympic bronze medalists for Kenya
Chicago Marathon female winners
New York City Marathon female winners
Medalists at the 2000 Summer Olympics
Olympic bronze medalists in athletics (track and field)
Kenyan female cross country runners